Chaminda Boteju (born 6 August 1975) is a Sri Lankan former cricketer. He played in 33 first-class matches between 1995 and 2001. He is now an umpire, and stood in matches in the 2019–20 SLC Twenty20 Tournament.

References

External links
 

1975 births
Living people
Sri Lankan cricketers
Sri Lankan cricket umpires
Sinhalese Sports Club cricketers
Place of birth missing (living people)